Bert Wood Abbey (November 11, 1869 – June 11, 1962) was a Major League Baseball (MLB) pitcher.

Amateur career
After graduating from Vermont Academy in 1887, Abbey first began playing baseball as a freshman in college, when he recruited fellow students to form the Vermont Catamounts (UVM) team. At UVM, he made the baseball and training program progress quickly with his presence as player, coach, and captain. He graduated in 1891 from UVM, and the year after, Abbey's team at the university won almost every game they played, including games against professional teams.

Professional career
After his graduation, Abbey was drafted by the Washington Senators, with whom he pitched 14 games before being sold to the Pittsburgh Pirates. He was sent down to their farm team in Macon, Georgia. In , the Chicago Colts bought his services, and he remained with them until 1895, when he moved to the Brooklyn Grooms.

Abbey stayed with Brooklyn (renamed the Bridegrooms) for one more season. He played his last game in the majors on September 23, 1896, and pitched three more seasons in the minor leagues before retiring.

Death and legacy
Abbey died at the age of 92 in Essex Junction, Vermont less than a year after suffering a heart attack. He is buried at the Mountain View Cemetery in Essex Junction.

He was posthumously inducted into UVM's Athletic Hall of Fame in 1969.

Quotation
 "Baseball's okay in college, but no place for a man with brain!"

References

External links

1869 births
1962 deaths
People from Essex, Vermont
Vermont Academy alumni
Major League Baseball pitchers
Baseball players from Vermont
Washington Senators (1891–1899) players
Chicago Colts players
Brooklyn Grooms players
Brooklyn Bridegrooms players
Omaha Omahogs players
Macon Central City players
Macon Hornets players
Quincy Browns players
Quincy Ravens players
Kansas City Blues (baseball) players
Montreal Royals players
19th-century baseball players
Vermont Catamounts baseball coaches
Vermont Catamounts baseball players
Burials in Vermont